Alex Gino is an American children's book writer.  Gino's debut book, George, was the winner of the 2016 Stonewall Book Award as well as the 2016 Lambda Literary Award in the category of LGBT Children's/Young Adult.

Gino is genderqueer and uses singular they pronouns and the honorific Mx.

Biography 
Gino was born and raised in Staten Island, New York, but over the years they have lived in such locations as Philadelphia, Pennsylvania; Brooklyn, New York; Astoria, Queens; Northampton, Massachusetts; and Oakland, California. They have also spent time living in an RV and driving around the country.

Works 
Gino is best known for their 2015 debut novel George, a middle grade novel featuring a young transgender girl, which they first began work on in 2003. The working title of the novel was Girl George (a reference to Boy George), though when the book was bought by Scholastic, this was changed to the present title to broaden readership. Gino has expressed some regrets about deadnaming their character with this title, and in 2021 announced that they were renaming the novel Melissa's Story.

In 2018, Gino released another middle grade novel, You Don't Know Everything, Jilly P! It covers Deaf culture and the Black Lives Matter movement and received starred reviews from Kirkus Reviews, Publishers Weekly, and the School Library Journal.

With regards to requests for a sequel to George, Gino stated in 2016 that "they will NOT be writing a transition story for a largely cis audience more interested in trans bodies than trans people."

Their 2020 novel Rick is a standalone follow-up to George and is about a student coming to terms with his asexuality. The book received starred reviews from Kirkus Reviews, Booklist, and School Library Journal.

Awards and honors 

Gino has been nominated for multiple awards for George, and has won several such as:
 2016 Stonewall Book Award: Mike Morgan and Larry Romans Children's Literature Award
 2016 Children's Choice Book Award: Debut Author
 2016 California Book Awards: Juvenile (Gold)
 2016 Lambda Literary Award: LGBT Children's/Young Adult
 2016 American Library Association: Top Ten Challenged Books of 2016

References

External links 
 

American children's writers
Non-binary writers
Lambda Literary Award for Children's and Young Adult Literature winners
Living people
Writers from Staten Island
Year of birth missing (living people)
Novelists from New York (state)
21st-century American novelists
Stonewall Book Award winners
21st-century American LGBT people